Port of Kherson (Khersonsky morsky port) is a port in the city of Kherson, Ukraine. It is located in the delta of Dnieper river.

The berthing line of the seaport is 1.5 km (10 berths), with depths up to 9.6 m. The port is served by the railway station Kherson-Port, has one railway entry. There are 7 railway tracks in the port area with a total length of 3.2 km. The highways are adjacent to the port.

The cargo turnover of Kherson seaport in 2016 amounted to 3.7 million tons. The capacity of terminals of Kherson seaport reaches 8.0 million tons / year.

See also
Battle of Kherson
Kherson River Port
List of ports in Ukraine

References

External links
 Ukrmorrichflot State Administration website
 Port of Kherson

Buildings and structures in Kherson Oblast
Kherson
Kherson
Kherson
Ukrainian Sea Ports Authority